There are 47 species and 123 subspecies from the family Tinamidae

Tinaminae
Tinamus
 Tinamus guttatus white-throated tinamou
 Tinamus tao grey tinamou
 T. tao larensis
 T. tao kleei
 T. tao septentrionalis
 T. tao tao
 Tinamus solitarius solitary tinamou
 Tinamus osgoodi black tinamou
 T. osgoodi hershkovitzi
 T. osgoodi osgoodi
 Tinamus major great tinamou
 T. major percautus
 T. major robustus
 T. major fuscipennis
 T. major castaneiceps
 T. major brunniventris
 T. major saturatus
 T. major latifrons
 T. major zuliensis
 T. major major
 T. major olivascens
 T. major peruvianus
 T. major serratus
 Nothocercus
 Nothocercus bonapartei highland tinamou
 N. bonapartei frantzii
 N. bonapartei bonapartei
 N. bonapartei discrepans
 N. bonapartei intercedens
 N. bonapartei plumbeiceps
 Nothocercus julius tawny-breasted tinamou
 Nothocercus nigrocapillus hooded tinamou
 N. nigrocapillus cadwaladeri
 N. nigrocapillus nigrocapillus
 Crypturellus
 Crypturellus berlepschi Berlepsch's tinamou
 Crypturellus soui little tinamou
 C. soui meserythrus
 C. soui modestus
 C. soui capnodes
 C. soui poliocephalus
 C. soui caucae
 C. soui harterti
 C. soui mustelinus
 C. soui caqueta
 C. soui nigriceps
 C. soui soui
 C. soui albigularis
 C. soui inconspicuus
 C. soui andrei
 C. soui panamensis
 Crypturellus cinereus cinereous tinamou
 Crypturellus ptaritepui tepuí tinamou
 Crypturellus obsoletus brown tinamou
 C. obsoletus obsoletus
 C. obsoletus griseiventris
 C. obsoletus hypochraceus
 C. obsoletus punensis
 C. obsoletus traylori
 C. obsoletus ochraceiventris
 C. obsoletus castaneus
 C. obsoletus knoxi
 C. obsoletus cerviniventris
 Crypturellus undulatus undulated tinamou
 C. undulatus manapiare
 C. undulatus simplex
 C. undulatus adspersus
 C. undulatus yapura
 C. undulatus vermiculatus
 C. undulatus undulatus
 Crypturellus transfasciatus pale-browed tinamou
 Crypturellus strigulosus Brazilian tinamou
 Crypturellus duidae grey-legged tinamou
 Crypturellus erythropus red-legged tinamou
 C. erythropus erythropus
 C. erythropus cursitans
 C. erythropus spencei
 C. erythropus margaritae
 C. erythropus saltuarius Magdalena tinamou
 C. erythropus columbianus Colombian tinamou
 C. erythropus idoneus Santa Marta tinamou
 Crypturellus noctivagus yellow-legged tinamou
  C. noctivagus noctivagus
  C. noctivagus zabele
 Crypturellus atrocapillus black-capped tinamou
 C. atrocapillus atrocapillus
 C. atrocapillus garleppi
 Crypturellus cinnamomeus thicket tinamou
 C. cinnamomeus cinnamomeus
 C. cinnamomeus occidentalis
 C. cinnamomeus mexicanus
 C. cinnamomeus sallaei
 C. cinnamomeus goldmani
 C. cinnamomeus soconuscensis
 C. cinnamomeus vicinor
 C. cinnamomeus delattrei
 C. cinnamomeus praepes
 Crypturellus boucardi slaty-breasted tinamou or Boucard's tinamou
 C. boucardi boucardi
 C. boucardi costaricensis
 Crypturellus kerriae Chocó tinamou
 Crypturellus variegatus variegated tinamou
 Crypturellus brevirostris rusty tinamou or short-billed tinamou
 Crypturellus bartletti Bartlett's tinamou
 Crypturellus parvirostris small-billed tinamou
 Crypturellus casiquiare barred tinamou
 Crypturellus tataupa tataupa tinamou
 C. tataupa tataupa
 C. tataupa inops
 C. tataupa peruvianus
 C. tataupa lepidotus

Nothurinae
 Rhynchotus
 Rhynchotus rufescens red-winged tinamou
 R. rufescens rufescens
 R. rufescens catingae
 R. rufescens pallescens
 Rhynchotus maculicollis huayco tinamou
 Nothoprocta
 Nothoprocta taczanowskii Taczanowski's tinamou
 Nothoprocta ornata ornate tinamou
 N. ornata ornata
 N. ornata branickii
 N. ornata rostrata
 Nothoprocta perdicaria Chilean tinamou
 N. perdicaria perdicaria
 N. perdicaria sanborni
 Nothoprocta cinerascens brushland tinamou
 N. cinerascens cinerascens
 N. cinerascens parvimaculata
 Nothoprocta pentlandii Andean tinamou
 N. pentlandii pentlandii
 N. pentlandii ambigua
 N. pentlandii oustaleti
 N. pentlandii niethammeri
 N. pentlandii fulvescens
 N. pentlandii doeringi
 N. pentlandii mendozae
 Nothoprocta curvirostris curve-billed tinamou
 N. curvirostris curvirostris
 N. curvirostris peruviana
 Nothura
 Nothura boraquira white-bellied nothura
 Nothura minor lesser nothura
 Nothura darwinii Darwin's nothura
 N. darwinii darwinii
 N. darwinii peruviana
 N. darwinii agassizii
 N. darwinii boliviana
 N. darwinii salvadorii
 Nothura maculosa spotted nothura
 N. maculosa maculosa
 N. maculosa major
 N. maculosa nigroguttata
 N. maculosa cearensis
 N. maculosa paludivaga
 N. maculosa annectens
 N. maculosa submontana
 N. maculosa pallida
 Nothura chacoensis Chaco nothura
 Taoniscus
 Taoniscus nanus dwarf tinamou
 Eudromia
 Eudromia elegans elegant crested tinamou
 E. elegans elegans
 E. elegans intermedia
 E. elegans magnistriata
 E. elegans riojana
 E. elegans albida
 E. elegans multiguttata
 E. elegans devia
 E. elegans patagonica
 Eudromia formosa quebracho crested tinamou
 E. formosa formosa
 E. formosa mira
 Tinamotis
 Tinamotis pentlandii Puna tinamou or Pentland's tinamou
 Tinamotis ingoufi Patagonian tinamou or Ingouf's tinamou

Footnotes

References
 

Lists of birds
Lists of animal species
'
'
'
'
Taxonomic lists (subspecies)